Ira Middleswarth & Son, Inc., more commonly referred to as Middleswarth Potato Chips, is an American potato chip manufacturer.

History 
Ira Middleswarth & Son, Inc. was founded in 1942 by Bob Middleswarth. That same year the company began producing potato chips using a single in a small two-room building on the property of Middleswarth's family in Beavertown, Snyder County, Pennsylvania. In 1959 the company expanded to a larger facility. That same year the company began producing over 300 lbs of chips an hour with the help of its 20 employees. In 1961 they moved once again to their current location in Middleburg, Pennsylvania, when Bob Middleswarth was named president. After Bob's retirement in 2002 and subsequent death, his son David Middleswarth became company president.

Products 

As of August 2020 Middleswarth sells the following potato chip flavors:

 Regular
 Bar-B-Q
 Sour cream & onion
 Sea salt & vinegar
 Jalapeno
 Kettle cooked
 Kettle cooked Bar-B-Q
 Kettle cooked Sour cream & onion
 Unsalted

List of company presidents 

 Bob & Lottie Middleswarth (1942–1953)
 Ira Middleswarth (1953–1961)
 Bob Middleswarth (1961–2002)
 David Middleswarth (2002–present)

In popular culture 
In 2014 a product placement company reached out to Middleswarth for product to be used in upcoming projects. Middleswarth was later told a bag of their chips was to be featured in the upcoming Rocky film series release, Creed. However, the scene featuring the chips was later scrapped and didn't make it into the film.

In 2015 a bag of Middleswarth Bar-B-Q Potato Chips was featured multiple times in the background of shot in ABC's hit comedy Modern Family.

See also 
 List of Pennsylvania companies

References 

American food and drink organizations
Snack food manufacturers of Pennsylvania